The 2002 Kremlin Cup was a tennis tournament played on indoor carpet courts at the Olympic Stadium in Moscow in Russia that was part of the International Series of the 2002 ATP Tour and of Tier I of the 2002 WTA Tour. The tournament ran from 30 September through 6 October 2002.

Finals

Men's singles

 Paul-Henri Mathieu defeated  Sjeng Schalken 4–6, 6–2, 6–0
 It was Mathieu's 1st title of the year and the 1st of his career.

Women's singles

 Magdalena Maleeva defeated  Lindsay Davenport 5–7, 6–3, 7–6(7–4)
 It was Maleeva's 2nd title of the year and the 10th of her career.

Men's doubles

 Roger Federer /  Max Mirnyi defeated  Joshua Eagle /  Sandon Stolle 6–4, 7–6(7–0)
 It was Federer's 3rd title of the year and the 4th of his career. It was Mirnyi's 3rd title of the year and the 13th of his career.

Women's doubles

 Elena Dementieva /  Janette Husárová defeated  Jelena Dokić /  Nadia Petrova 2–6, 6–3, 7–6(7–0)
 It was Dementieva's 3rd title of the year and the 3rd of her career. It was Husárová's 4th title of the year and the 12th of her career.

References

External links
 Official website 
 Official website 
 ATP Tournament Profile
 WTA Tournament Profile

Kremlin Cup
Kremlin Cup
Kremlin Cup
Kremlin Cup
Kremlin Cup
Kremlin Cup
Kremlin Cup